Brudzewice-Kolonia  is a village in the administrative district of Gmina Poświętne, within Opoczno County, Łódź Voivodeship, in central Poland.

References

Brudzewice-Kolonia